Conqueror is the fifth and final book of the Conqueror series written by Conn Iggulden. Conqueror tells the story of Kublai Khan – portrayed as one of the world's great leaders alongside Julius Caesar, Alexander the Great, and Napoleon Bonaparte. The story takes place between 1244 and 1260 AD.

Summary

A warrior who would rule a fifth of the world with strength and wisdom.
A scholar who conquered an empire larger than those of Alexander or Caesar.
A brother who betrayed his own to protect a nation.

From a wise scholar to one of history's most powerful warriors, Conqueror tells the story of Kublai Khan - an extraordinary man who should be remembered alongside Julius Caesar, Alexander the Great and Napoleon Bonaparte as one of the greatest leaders the world has ever known.

It should have been a golden age, with an empire to dwarf the lands won by the mighty Genghis Khan. Instead, the vast Mongol nation is slowly losing ground, swallowed whole by their most ancient enemy. A new generation has arisen, yet the long shadow of the Great Khan still hangs over them all …

Kublai dreams of an empire stretching from sea to sea. But to see it built, this scholar must first learn the art of war. He must take his nation’s warriors to the ends of the known world. And when he is weary, when he is wounded, he must face his own brothers in bloody civil war.

Main characters

Mongke, Kublai, Hulegu and Arik-Boke

Four of the grandsons of Genghis Khan. Sons of Tolui.

Guyuk

Son of Ogedai Khan and Torogene.

Batu

Son of Jochi, grandson of Genghis. Becomes Russian Lord.

Tsubodai

The great general of Genghis and Ogedai Khan.

Torogene

Guyuk's mother, who ruled as regent on the death of Ogedai Khan.

Sorhatani

Mother to four grandsons of Genghis - Mongke, Kublai, Hulegu and Arik-Boke. Wife to Tolui, the youngest son of Genghis, who gave his life to save Ogedai Khan.

Baidur

Grandson of Genghis. Son to Chagatai, father to Alghu. Ruler of the Chagatai Khanate-based around the cities Samarkand and Bukhara. (Arabia)

Notes

External links 
 
 Conn Iggulden page on publisher HarperCollins' website

2011 British novels
Conqueror (novel series)
Novels set in Mongol Empire
Novels set in the 13th century
Cultural depictions of Kublai Khan
HarperCollins books